Hundra is an action game developed by Spanish studio Zeus Software and published by Dinamic Software for the Amstrad CPC, MSX and ZX Spectrum in 1988. It was loosely inspired by the 1983 film Hundra but is not based on it.

Gameplay

Plot

Reception
Hundra was well received by Spanish press, including review scores of 44/50 from Amstrad Accion and 9/10 from Micromania. The game was famous for its erotic cover art, which won the best title art of 1988 award from MicroHobby.

References

External links
Hundra at MobyGames
Hundra at World of Spectrum

1988 video games
Action video games
Amstrad CPC games
Dinamic Software games
Fantasy video games
MSX games
Single-player video games
Video games based on Norse mythology
Video games developed in Spain
Video games featuring female protagonists
ZX Spectrum games